Elena Likhovtseva and Jana Novotná were the defending champions, but none of them competed this year. Novotná also retired from professional tennis at the end of the 1999 season.

Virginia Ruano Pascual and Paola Suárez won the title by defeating Conchita Martínez and Patricia Tarabini 7–5, 6–3 in the final. It was the 5th title for Ruano Pascual and the 13th title for Suárez in their respective doubles careers. It was also the 1st title for the pair during the season.

Seeds
The first four seeds received a bye into the second round.

Draw

Finals

Top half

Bottom half

External links
 Official results archive (ITF)
 Official results archive (WTA)

Family Circle Cup
Charleston Open